Praezygaena is a genus of moths in the family Zygaenidae. The genus was established as a subgenus of Epizygaena.

Selected species
Praezygaena agria (Distant, 1892)
Praezygaena caschmirensis (Kollar, 1844)
Praezygaena conjuncta (Hampson, 1920)
Praezygaena lateralis (Jordan, 1907)
Praezygaena microsticha (Jordan, 1907)
Praezygaena myodes (Druce, 1899)
Praezygaena ochroptera (Felder, 1874)

External links
 Butterflies and Moths of the World - Generic Names and their Type-species
 Praezygaena at Afro Moths

Zygaeninae
Zygaenidae genera